The Australian Children's Education and Care Quality Authority (ACECQA) is an independent statutory authority that assists governments in implementing the National Quality Framework (NQF) for early childhood education and care throughout Australia. Established in 2012, the authority works with the federal, state and territory government departments to:
implement changes that benefit children birth to 13 years of age and their families;
monitor and promote the consistent application of the Education and Care Services National Law across all states and territories; and
support the early childhood education and care sector to improve quality outcomes for children.

ACECQA is ultimately responsible to the Education Council, one of eight Standing Councils established under the Council of Australian Governments arrangements.

See also 
 Early Childhood Australia
 List of Australian government entities
 National Quality Standard

References

External links 
 Australian Children’s Education and Care Quality Authority website

Education in Australia
Child care skills organizations
Child-related organisations in Australia
Government agencies of Australia
Government agencies established in 2012
2012 establishments in Australia